Agathodes musivalis is a species of moth of the family Crambidae described by Achille Guenée in 1854. It is found in Mayotte, Congo, Kenya, Réunion, Malawi, Mauritius, Madagascar, Mozambique, Somalia, South Africa, Uganda, Zambia and Zimbabwe.

The larvae have been recorded feeding on Erythrina indica and Erythrina caffra (Fabaceae).

The common name is Painted Pearl.

References

Guenée, A. M. 1854. Histoire naturelle des Insectes. VIII. Species général des Lépidoptères. Deltoites et Pyralites. - — 8:1–448.

External links
 "Agathodes musivalis, Guenée, 1854". African Moths. Retrieved March 9, 2018.

Spilomelinae
Moths of Africa
Moths of Madagascar
Moths of Réunion
Lepidoptera of Uganda
Lepidoptera of Mozambique
Moths of the Comoros
Moths of Mauritius
Lepidoptera of Malawi
Lepidoptera of Zambia
Lepidoptera of Zimbabwe
Moths described in 1908
Taxa named by Achille Guenée